Corticium diamantense is a species of sea sponge in the order Homosclerophorida, first found in vertical walls of reef caves at depths of about  in the Caribbean Sea. This species has oscula situated near its border; regular non-lophose calthrops of one size, rare tetralophose calthrops and candelabra, the fourth actine of which is basally ramified into 4 or 5 microspined rays.

References

Further reading
Willenz, P. "Five new species of Homoscleromorpha (Porifera) from the Caribbean Sea and re-description of Plakina jamaicensis." Journal of the Marine Biological Association of the United Kingdom 2 (2014).
Domingos, Celso, Anaíra Lage, and Guilherme Muricy. "Overview of the biodiversity and distribution of the Class Homoscleromorpha in the Tropical Western Atlantic." Journal of the Marine Biological Association of the United Kingdom: 1-11.

External links

WORMS

Homoscleromorpha
Animals described in 2014